Monte San Giovanni may refer to:

Monte San Giovanni Campano, Italian municipality of the province of Frosinone
Monte San Giovanni in Sabina, Italian municipality of the province of Rieti